Workforce productivity is the amount of goods and services that a group of workers produce in a given amount of time. It is one of several types of productivity that economists measure. Workforce productivity, often referred to as labor productivity, is a measure for an organisation or company, a process, an industry, or a country.

Workforce productivity is to be distinguished from employee productivity which is a measure employed at the individual level based on the assumption that the overall productivity can be broken down into increasingly smaller units until, ultimately, to the individual employee, in order be used for example for the purpose of allocating a benefit or sanction based on individual performance (see also: Vitality curve).

In 2002, the OECD defined it as "the ratio of a volume measure of output to a volume measure of input". Volume measures of output are normally gross domestic product (GDP) or gross value added (GVA), expressed at constant prices i.e. adjusted for inflation. The three most commonly used measures of input are:
 hours worked, typically from the OECD Annual National Accounts database
 workforce jobs; and
 number of people in employment.

Measurement 
Workforce productivity can be measured in two ways, in physical terms or in price terms.
 the intensity of labour-effort, and the quality of labour effort generally.
 the creative activity involved in producing technical innovations.
 the relative efficiency gains resulting from different systems of management, organization, co-ordination or engineering.
 the productive effects of some forms of labour on other forms of labour.

These aspects of productivity refer to the qualitative dimensions of labour input. If an organization is using labour much more intensely, one can assume it's due to greater labour productivity, since the output per labour-effort may be the same. This insight becomes particularly important when a large part of what is produced in an economy consists of services. Management may be very preoccupied with the productivity of employees, but the productivity gains of management itself are very difficult to prove. While labor productivity growth has been seen as a useful barometer of the U.S. economy’s performance, recent research has examined why U.S. labor productivity rose during the recent downturn of 2008–2009, when U.S. gross domestic product plummeted.

The validity of international comparisons of labour productivity can be limited by a number of measurement issues. The comparability of output measures can be negatively affected by the use of different valuations, which define the inclusion of taxes, margins, and costs, or different deflation indexes, which turn the current output into constant output. Labor input can be biased by different methods used to estimate average hours or different methodologies used to estimate employed persons.  In addition, for level comparisons of labor productivity, the output needs to be converted into a common currency.  The preferred conversion factors are Purchasing Power Parities, but their accuracy can be negatively influenced by the limited representativeness of the goods and services compared and different aggregation methods. To facilitate international comparisons of labor productivity, a number of organizations, such as the OECD, the Groningen Growth Centre, the International Labor Comparisons Program, and The Conference Board, prepare productivity data adjusted specifically to enhance the data’s international comparability.

Factors of labour productivity and quality 

In a survey of manufacturing growth and performance in Britain and Mauritius, it was found that:

 
"The factors affecting labour productivity or the performance of individual work roles are of broadly the same type as those that affect the performance of manufacturing firms as a whole. They include: (1) physical-organic, location, and technological factors; (2) cultural belief-value and individual attitudinal, motivational and behavioural factors; (3) international influences – e.g. levels of innovativeness and efficiency on the part of the owners and managers of inward investing foreign companies; (4) managerial-organizational and wider economic and political-legal environments; (5) levels of flexibility in internal labour markets and the organization of work activities – e.g. the presence or absence of traditional craft demarcation lines and barriers to occupational entry; and (6) individual rewards and payment systems, and the effectiveness of personnel managers and others in recruiting, training, communicating with, and performance-motivating employees on the basis of pay and other incentives."

It was further found that:

 
"The emergence of computers has been noted as a significant factor in increasing labor productivity in the late 1990s, by some, and as an insignificant factor by others, such as R.J. Gordon. Although computers have existed for most of the 20th century, some economic researchers have noted a lag in productivity growth caused by computers that didn't come until the late 1990s."

See also
 List of countries by labour productivity
 Overall labor effectiveness
 Personal income in the United States

References

External links 

  
 Figures for the US from BLS

Labour economics indices
Productivity
Industrial and organizational psychology
Performance psychology